The London and North Eastern Railway Class J38 was a class of steam locomotive designed for freight transport.  They were designed by Nigel Gresley and introduced in 1926. A total of 35 were built at the LNER's Darlington Works in 1926 and they were used in Scotland. All passed into British Railways ownership in 1948 and they were renumbered from 5900–5934 to 65900–65934.

The far more numerous J39 class was a later development, exchanging the J38's  driving wheels with larger .  Some of the J38s were later rebuilt with J39 boilers.

Dimensions
 BR Power classification: 6F
 Locomotive weight: 
 Tender weight: 
 Boiler pressure: 
 Superheater: Yes
 Cylinders: 
 Driving wheel diameter: 
 Tractive effort: 
 Valve gear: Stephenson 
piston valves

Withdrawal
All J38s were withdrawn between 1962 and 1967, with the last two in service being No. 65901 and No. 65929. These two engines were the last ones designed by Gresley to be withdrawn. All engines of this class were scrapped.

Sources

External links 

 The Gresley J38 0-6-0 Locomotives LNER encyclopedia
 Class J38 Details at Rail UK

0-6-0 locomotives
J38
Railway locomotives introduced in 1926
Scrapped locomotives
Standard gauge steam locomotives of Great Britain
Freight locomotives